Rusciori may refer to several places in Romania:

 Rusciori, a village in the town of Scornicești, Olt County
 Rusciori, a village in Șura Mică Commune, Sibiu County
Rusciori (river), a tributary of the Cibin in Sibiu County

See also 
Rus (surname)
Rusu (disambiguation)
Rusca (disambiguation)
Ruseni (disambiguation)
Rusești (disambiguation)